The 2016 Mid-American Conference men's basketball tournament was a post-season basketball tournament for the Mid-American Conference (MAC) 2015–16 college basketball season. Tournament first-round games were held on campus sites at the higher seed on March 7. The remaining rounds were held at Quicken Loans Arena in Cleveland between March 10–12. Buffalo won the tournament and received the conference's automatic bid into the 2016 NCAA tournament where they lost to Miami (FL) in the first round.

Format
In 2016, the tournament reverted to its original structure with the top four seeds receiving just one bye into the quarterfinals. From 2012 to 2015, the top two seeds received byes into the semifinals while the third and fourth seeds received a bye to the quarterfinals.

Seeds

Schedule

Bracket

First round games at campus sites of lower-numbered seeds

All-Tournament Team
Tournament MVP – Willie Conner, Buffalo

See also
2016 MAC women's basketball tournament

References

External links
 2016 MAC Men's Basketball Tournament

Mid-American Conference men's basketball tournament
Tournament
MAC men's basketball tournament
MAC men's basketball tournament
Basketball competitions in Cleveland
College baseball tournaments in Ohio